Punk Goes 90's is the fifth album in the Punk Goes... series and the first installment in the Punk Goes 90's series created by Fearless Records. It contains popular songs from the 1990s covered by various alternative rock bands. The cover art references Nirvana's iconic Nevermind cover, on which "In Bloom" originally appeared. As of 2017 there have been a total of two albums in the franchise.

Track listing

References

Covers albums
Punk Goes series
Albums produced by Mark Hoppus
2006 compilation albums